Ernest Atangana Mboa (born 16 May 1971) is a Cameroonian boxer. He competed in the men's welterweight event at the 1996 Summer Olympics.

References

1971 births
Living people
Cameroonian male boxers
Olympic boxers of Cameroon
Boxers at the 1996 Summer Olympics
Place of birth missing (living people)
Welterweight boxers
20th-century Cameroonian people